Christina or Cristina is a feminine given name. It is a simplified form of the Latin Christiana, and a feminine form of Christianus or a Latinized form of the Middle English Christin 'Christian' (Old English christen, from Latin). Short forms include Chris and Tina. The name is ultimately  derived from the original Greek form of the name Χριστίνα.

Variant forms

Alternative forms of the name, including spelling variations, nicknames and diminutive forms, include:
Ying Chistinping (Chinese)
Chislee (Korean)
Christnah (Indian)
Cairistìona (Scottish Gaelic)
Chris (English)
Chrissie (English)
کریستینا (Arabic)
Chrissy (English)
Christa (Danish, English, German)
Christabel (English)
Christabella (English)
Christabelle (French, English)
Christel (German)
Christelle (French)
Christena
Christi (English)
Christiana (Latin, Spanish)
Christiane (French, German)
Christianne (French, German)
Christie (English)
Christin (German, Scandinavian)
Christina (German, English, Greek, Swedish)
Christine (English, French, German, Scandinavian)
Christobel (English)
Christy (English)
Chrys (English)
Chrystina (English)
Crestienne (French)
Cris (Spanish)
Crista (Spanish)
Cristeena (Manx)
Cristen (English)
Cristiana (Italian, Spanish)
Cristin (Irish)
Cristina (Catalan, Italian, English, Portuguese, Romanian, Spanish, Galician)
Cristiona, Crístíona (Irish)
Cristi (Spanish)
Cristy (Spanish, English)
Crystin (Welsh)
Hristina (Bulgarian, Greek)
Karisaṭīnā (ਕਰਿਸਟੀਨਾ) (Punjabi) 
Kèlǐsīdìnà (克里斯蒂娜) (Chinese)
Kerstin (German, Swedish)
Keuriseutina (크리스티나) (Korean)
Khristina (Russian)
Khris̄tinā (คริสตินา) (Thai)
Khristya (Russian)
Khrysta (Russian)
Khrustina (Bulgarian)
Kia (Swedish)
Kiersten (Danish, English)
Kilikina (Hawaiian)
Kiṟisṭiṉā (கிறிஸ்டினா) (Tamil)
Kirsi (Finnish)
Kirsteen (Scots)
Kirsten (Scandinavian)
Kirsti (Finnish)
Kirstie (Scots)
Kirstin (Estonian, Scots)
Kirsty (Scots)
Kistiñe (Basque)
Kjersti (Norwegian)
Kjerstin (Norwegian, Swedish)
Kolina (Swedish)
Кристина (Kristina) (Macedonian, Serbian)
Kris (Danish, English)
Krisztina (Hungarian)
Krista (Czech, English, Estonian, German, Latvian)
Kristen (English)
Kristi (English, Estonian)
Kristia (English)
Kristiana (Latvian)
Kristiane (German)
Kristie (English)
Kristiina (Estonian, Finnish)
Kristin (English, Estonian, German, Norwegian, Scandinavian, Czech)
Kristína (Czech, Slovakian, Albanian)
Kristina (Croatian, Czech, English, German, Indonesia, Lithuanian, Russian, Serbian, Slovene, Swedish)
Krisṭīnā (ક્રિસ્ટીના) (Gujarati)
Krisṭinā (ಕ್ರಿಸ್ಟಿನಾ) (Kannada)
Krisṭīnā (क्रिस्टीना) (Marathi, Nepali, Hindi)
Krisṭinā (క్రిస్టినా) (Telugu)
ქრისტინე (Kristine) (Georgian)
Kristine (Danish, English, German, Latvian, Norwegian)
Kristinë (Albanian)
Kristinka (Czech)
Kristjana (Icelandic)
Kristy (English)
Kristýna (Czech)
Kriszta (Hungarian)
Kriszti (Hungarian)
Krisztina (Hungarian)
Krysia (Polish language|Polish)
Krysta (Polish)
Krysten (English)
Krystiana (Polish)
Krystina (English)
Krystka (Polish)
Krystyn (Polish)
Krystyna (Polish)
Krystynka (Polish)
Kurisu, Kurisutīna (クリスティーナ) (Japanese)
Kyrsten (English)
Nina
Qrystynʼa (קריסטינאַ) (Yiddish)
Risten (Northern Sami)
Stiina (Estonian, Finnish)
Stina (German, Scandinavian)
Stine (Danish, Norwegian)
Stinne (Danish)
Teeny (Scottish)
Tiina (Estonian, Finnish)
Tina (Dutch, English, Greek, Italian, Russian, Slovene)
Tine (Danish, Norwegian)
Tineke (Dutch)
Týna (Czech)
Христина (Khrystyna) (Ukrainian)
Χριστίνα (Hristina or Christina) (Greek)
کریستینا (Persian)
کرسٹینا (Urdu)

People

 Religious figures
 Saint Christina (disambiguation), several people with the name
 Christina the Astonishing (1150–1224), also known as 'Christina Mirabilis', a Christian holy-woman of Belgium, and Haines

Historical figures
 Christina of Markyate (1096-1155), English abbess and mystic
 Christina of the Isles (fl. 1290–1318), Scottish noblewoman
 Christina Marshall Colville (1852-1936), Scottish temperance leader
 Christina Gyllenstierna (1494–1559), Swedish national heroine
 Maria Kristina Kiellström (1744–1789), Swedish silk manufacturer
 Christina Rauscher (1570-1618), German official and critic of witch trials
 Christina Rossetti (1830–1894), English poet
 Christina Doreothea Stuart (fl. 1774), Norwegian artist

Royalty
 Kristina Abrahamsdotter (1432–1492), Queen of Sweden 1470
 Christina of Denmark (1521–1590), Danish princess
 Christina of Sweden (1626–1689), Queen regnant of Sweden from 1632 to 1654
 Princess Christina of the Netherlands, Dutch princess
 Princess Christina, Mrs. Magnuson, Swedish princess
 Maria Christina of Austria
 Archduchess Maria Christina, Duchess of Teschen
 Princess Maria Christina of Saxony (disambiguation), several people
 Princess Alexandra Christina, Countess of Frederiksborg
 Christina of Milan

Politicians
Christina (Chrystia) Freeland, Canadian politician
Christina Höj Larsen (born 1971), Swedish politician
Christina Liew (born 1951), Malaysian politician
Christina Liu (born 1955), Taiwanese politician
Christina Jordan (born 1962), British politician
Cristina Kirchner (born 1953), President of Argentina (2007-2015)
Christina McKelvie (born 1968), British politician
Christina Olumeko (born 1996), Danish politician
Christina Rees (born 1954), British politician
Christina Stumpp (born 1987), German politician

Entertainers
 Christina Aguilar (born 1966), Thai pop singer
 Christina Aguilera (born 1980), American pop singer
 Christina Applegate (born 1971), American actress
 Christina Christian (born 1981), American singer
 Christina Cole (born 1982), English actress
 Christina Grimmie (1994-2016), American singer
 Christina Hendricks (born 1975), American actress
 Christina Kalogerikou (1885-1968), Greek actress
 Christina Metaxa (born 1992), Greek Cypriot singer and songwriter
 Christina Milian (born 1981), American pop singer
 Christina Moore (born 1973), American actress
 Christina Perri (born 1986), American singer
 Christina Pickles (born 1935), English/American actress
 Christina Ricci (born 1980), American actress
 Christina Schollin (born 1937), Swedish actress
 Cristina Stamate (1946 – 2017), Romanian actress
 Christina Tsafou (born 1957), Greek actress
 Christina Vidal (born 1981), American actress

Sportspeople
 Christina Ashcroft (born 1964), Canadian sport shooter
 Christina Bernardi (born 1990), Australian footballer
 Christina Bourmpou (born 2000), Greek rower
 Christina Boxer (born 1957), English middle-distance runner
 Christina Crawford (wrestler) (born 1988), American dancer, wrestler, and WWE Diva
 Christina Dragan (born 2007), Romanian-American rhythmic gymnast
 Christina Giazitzidou (born 1989), Greek rower
 Christina Ioannidi (born 1982), Soviet-Greek weightlifter
 Hristina Kokotou, Greek race walker
 Christina Kotsia (born 1994), Greek water polo player
 Christína Papadáki (born 1973), Greek tennis player
 Christina Sandberg (born 1948), Swedish tennis player
 Christina Thalassinidou (born 1970), Soviet-Greek synchronized swimmer
 Christina Von Eerie (born Christina Kardooni, 1989), American wrestler
 Christina Wheeler (born 1982), Australian tennis player
 Christina Yannetsos (born 1983), American judoka
 Christina Zachariadou (born 1974), Greek tennis player

Other
 Cristina Rodríguez Cabral (born 1959), Uruguayan poet, researcher, and Afro-Uruguayan activist
 Christina Crawford, author and actress who was abused by adoptive mother Joan Crawford
 Christina Dodwell (born 1951), explorer and travel writer
 Cristina García Rodero (born 1949), Spanish photographer
 Christina Goldschmidt, British statistician
 Christina Katrakis (born 1980), American artist
 Christina Larner (1933–1983), British historian
 Christina Lekka (born c. 1972) Greek fashion model
 Christina McAnea (born 1958), British trade union leader
 Christina Onassis, Greek shipping heiress
 Christina Hoff Sommers (born 1950), American author and philosopher
 Christina Tosi, American chef, author, and TV personality
 Christina Twomey, Australian historian

Fictional characters
 Christina, from Mobile Suit Gundam: Char's Counterattack
 Christina, a character from the novel and movie Divergent
 Christina Hawthorne, the main character from the TV series Hawthorne
 Christina Berg (usually called Chris), in the Norwegian TV show Skam
 Christina Gallagher, a character from the US TV series House of Cards
 Christina Parsons (later Russell), the central character of the Flambards trilogy by K. M. Peyton and the TV series adapted from it

References 

Given names of Greek language origin
English feminine given names
Greek feminine given names
English-language feminine given names
Feminine given names
Sammarinese given names